Peacock fern is a common name for several plants and may refer to:

Diplazium hymenodes, a fern native to the Greater Antilles
Selaginella uncinata, a spikemoss native to tropical Asia and introduced to the Americas
Selaginella willdenowii, a spikemoss native to tropical Asia and introduced to the Americas